This was the first edition of the event.

Paul Annacone and Doug Flach won the title, defeating Jacco Eltingh and Paul Haarhuis 7–6, 6–3 in the final.

Seeds

  Jacco Eltingh /  Paul Haarhuis (final)
  Mark Keil /  Christo van Rensburg (semifinals)
  Jonas Björkman /  Patrick Rafter (semifinals)
  Paul Annacone /  Doug Flach (champions)

Draw

Draw

External links
 Draw

1993 ATP Tour